Year 974 (CMLXXIV) was a common year starting on Thursday (link will display the full calendar) of the Julian calendar.

Events 
 By place 

 Europe 
 Battle of Danevirke: Emperor Otto II defeats the rebel forces of King Harald I, who has invaded Nordalbingia (modern-day Holstein), to shake off imperial overlordship. Otto's armies swiftly subdue the Danes, consolidating the frontier between Scandinavia and Northern Germany. Meanwhile, Henry II begins a rebellion against his cousin Otto. He forges alliances with Bavarian and Saxon nobles.

 England 
 King Edgar I gives English help to Prince Hywel in ousting his uncle, King Iago of Gwynedd from his kingdom.
 A great earthquake occurs in England.

 Abbasid Caliphate 
 5 August – Caliph al-Muti, ill and incapacitated, is deposed and succeeded by his son al-Ta'i, dying shortly after.

 Africa 
 The Qarmatians are defeated north of Cairo by Fatimid forces under General Jawhar al-Siqilli. He consolidates Fatimid rule and sends a legation to the Christian land of Nubia to secure the southern border of Egypt. Arab traders introduce Islam to the population, which gradually supplants Christianity.
 An offensive, by the Spain-based Caliphate of Córdoba brings the Maghrebi Idrisid Dynasty to an end. Caliph Al-Hakam II maintains the supremacy of the caliphate over the kingdoms of Navarra, Castile and León.

 China 
 The Liao Dynasty exchanges ambassadors with the Song Dynasty on New Years Day (Spring Festival).
 The city of Fuzhou, located in Fujian province, builds new city walls.

 By topic 

 Religion 
 Summer – Pope Benedict VI is imprisoned in the Castel Sant'Angelo at Rome, where he is strangled to death through the influence of the powerful Crescentii family. Crescentius I (the Elder), Italian politician and aristocrat, engineers an election and replaces Benedict with his own candidate Franco, who ascends under the title anti-Pope Boniface VII.
 Fall – Boniface VII is expelled by order of Otto II and flees to Constantinople, taking the Church treasury of the Vatican Basilica along with him. He is succeeded by Benedict VII as the 135th pope of the Catholic Church.
 An abbey is founded at the site of Mönchengladbach (Germany).

Births 
 Bruno of Querfurt, German missionary bishop (d. 1009)
 Ermengol I, count of Urgell (d. 1010)
 Frederick, count of Walbeck (d. 1018)
 Fujiwara no Korechika, Japanese nobleman (d. 1010)

Deaths 
 March 7 – John of Gorze, Frankish abbot and diplomat 
 October 12 – Al-Muti, caliph of the Abbasid Caliphate (b. 914)
 Al-Qadi al-Nu'man, Fatimid jurist and historian
 Benedict VI, pope of the Catholic Church
 Fujiwara no Yoshitaka, Japanese waka poet (b. 954)
 Muhammad Bal'ami, Persian historian and vizier
 Ratherius (or Rathier), bishop of Verona
 Shi Chonggui, emperor of Later Jin (b. 914)

References